Sargari Kalagh Khvordeh (also Romanized as Sargarī Kalāgh Khvordeh) is a village in Zilayi Rural District, Margown District, Boyer-Ahmad County, Kohgiluyeh and Boyer-Ahmad Province, Iran. According to the 2006 census, it had a population of 22, in 4 families.

References 

Populated places in Boyer-Ahmad County